Chippenham is a town in Wiltshire, England.

Chippenham may also refer to:

 Chippenham (UK Parliament constituency), a UK parliamentary constituency covering the North Wiltshire area
 Chippenham, Cambridgeshire, a village and civil parish in England
 Chippenham Parkway or State Route 150, Virginia, United States

See also
 Cippenham, Berkshire, England